The 1959 Masters Tournament was the 23rd Masters Tournament, held April 2–5 at Augusta National Golf Club in Augusta, Georgia. Art Wall Jr. shot a final round of 66 (−6), with birdies on five of the last six holes, for his only major title, one stroke ahead of runner-up Cary Middlecoff, the 1955 champion. Wall started the final round six strokes behind the leaders, in a tie for thirteenth place.

Defending champion Arnold Palmer was a third round co-leader,  but a triple-bogey at the par-3 12th led to a 74 and a third-place finish, two strokes back. The purse in 1959 was a record $76,100 with a winner's share of $15,000 to Wall. The estimated gallery for the final round on Sunday was 30,000 spectators.

Nineteen-year-old Jack Nicklaus made his Masters debut with 76-74 (150) and missed the cut by one stroke. He played in 45 Masters, the first three as an amateur, and only missed one cut (1967) in the next 34 Masters tournaments. Nicklaus won a record six green jackets and was runner-up four times in his 22 top-10 finishes.

Field
1. Masters champions
Jack Burke Jr. (4,10,11), Jimmy Demaret (8), Doug Ford (4,8,11), Claude Harmon (8), Ben Hogan (2,3,4,8,9), Herman Keiser, Cary Middlecoff (2,8), Byron Nelson (2,4,8), Arnold Palmer (8), Henry Picard (4), Gene Sarazen (2,3,4), Horton Smith, Sam Snead (3,4,8,10), Craig Wood (2)
Ralph Guldahl (2) did not play.

The following categories only apply to Americans

2. U.S. Open champions
Tommy Bolt (9,10,11), Julius Boros (9,10), Billy Burke, Chick Evans (5,a), Jack Fleck, Ed Furgol (11), Tony Manero, Lloyd Mangrum, Dick Mayer (11), Fred McLeod, Sam Parks Jr., Lew Worsham

3. The Open champions
Jock Hutchison (4), Denny Shute (4)

4. PGA champions
Walter Burkemo (9), Dow Finsterwald (8,10,11), Vic Ghezzi, Chick Harbert (8), Chandler Harper, Lionel Hebert (11), Johnny Revolta, Jim Turnesa

5. U.S. Amateur and Amateur champions
Dick Chapman (a), Charles Coe (6,7,8,9,a), Robert Sweeny Jr. (a)

6. Selections for the 1959 U.S. Walker Cup team
Tommy Aaron (7,a), Deane Beman (7,a), William C. Campbell (a), Bill Hyndman (a), Chuck Kocsis (7,a), Jack Nicklaus (a), Billy Joe Patton (8,a), Bud Taylor (7,a), Ward Wettlaufer (a)

Campbell and Kocsis were reserves for the team. Harvie Ward did not play.

7. 1958 U.S. Amateur quarter-finalists
Dick Foote (a), Roger McManus (a), Jack Westland (a)

8. Top 24 players and ties from the 1958 Masters Tournament
Billy Casper (9,10), Fred Hawkins (11), Jay Hebert (9,10), Ted Kroll (11), Billy Maxwell, Al Mengert, Phil Rodgers (a), Mike Souchak (10), Ken Venturi, Art Wall Jr. (11), Bo Wininger

9. Top 16 players and ties from the 1958 U.S. Open
Marty Furgol, Bob Goetz, Tommy Jacobs, Don January, Gene Littler, Dick Metz, Bob Rosburg, Frank Stranahan

10. Top eight players and ties from 1958 PGA Championship
Buster Cupit, Ed Oliver

11. Members of the U.S. 1957 Ryder Cup team

12. One player, either amateur or professional, not already qualified, selected by a ballot of ex-Masters champions
Ernie Vossler

13. One professional, not already qualified, selected by a ballot of ex-U.S. Open champions
George Bayer

14. One amateur, not already qualified, selected by a ballot of ex-U.S. Amateur champions
Don Cherry (a)

15. Two players, not already qualified, from a points list based on finishes in the winter part of the 1959 PGA Tour
Paul Harney, John McMullin

16.  Winner of the 1958 Canadian Open
Wes Ellis

17. Foreign invitations
Bruce Castator (a), Bruce Crampton, Stan Leonard (8), Henry Martell, Ángel Miguel, Gary Player (9), Dave Thomas, Peter Thomson (3,8), Retief Waltman

Numbers in brackets indicate categories that the player would have qualified under had they been American.

Round summaries

First round
Thursday, April 2, 1959

Source:

Second round
Friday, April 3, 1959

Source:

Third round
Saturday, April 4, 1959

Source:

Final round
Sunday, April 5, 1959

Final leaderboard

Sources:

Scorecard

Cumulative tournament scores, relative to par
{|class="wikitable" span = 50 style="font-size:85%;
|-
|style="background: Red;" width=10|
|Eagle 
|style="background: Pink;" width=10|
|Birdie
|style="background: PaleGreen;" width=10|
|Bogey
|style="background: Green;" width=10|
|Double bogey
|style="background: Olive;" width=10|
|Triple bogey+ 
|}

References

External links
Masters.com – past winners and results
Augusta.com – 1959 Masters leaderboard and scorecards

1959
1959 in golf
1959 in American sports
1959 in sports in Georgia (U.S. state)
April 1959 sports events in the United States